The Homicide Act 1957 (5 & 6 Eliz.2 c.11) is an Act of the Parliament of the United Kingdom. It was enacted as a partial reform of the common law offence of murder in English law by abolishing the doctrine of constructive malice (except in limited circumstances), reforming the partial defence of provocation, and by introducing the partial defences of diminished responsibility and suicide pact.  It restricted the use of the death penalty for murder.

Similar provisions to Part I of this Act was enacted for Northern Ireland by Part II of the Criminal Justice Act (Northern Ireland) 1966.

History
The Act was introduced following the Royal Commission on Capital Punishment 1949–53, and embodied some of its recommendations but differed from the main recommendation which was that "it is impracticable to find a satisfactory method of limiting the scope of capital punishment by dividing murder into degrees". During and after the royal commission there had been several controversial cases, including that of Derek Bentley in 1953 where a 19-year-old defendant was hanged for a murder committed by his 16-year-old co-defendant. (Bentley's conviction was found to be unsafe by the Court of Appeal in 1998) The hanging of Ruth Ellis in 1955 had also caused considerable unease with the system of capital punishment; Ellis had a strong potential defence of diminished responsibility, but the law did not provide for such a defence to a charge of murder.

In November 1955, after Home Secretary Gwilym Lloyd George announced the government's rejection of some of the Royal Commission's proposals, veteran MP Sydney Silverman introduced a Bill to abolish capital punishment. The Conservative government avoided a vote on it (which would have shown Conservative MPs to be divided), but a debate was held in February 1956 on a government motion and resulted in an abolitionist amendment being carried by 293 to 262. Silverman's Bill was then passed by the Commons but vetoed by the House of Lords.

In order to mollify the abolitionists, the government then announced it would bring in a reform to the law to curtail the use of capital punishment.

Part I – Amendments to the law of England and Wales as to the fact of Murder

This Part does not extend to Scotland.

Section 1 – Abolition of constructive malice

Constructive malice was the doctrine that malice aforethought, the mental element for murder, could be attributed to the defendant if death was caused during the commission of another felony (such as robbery or burglary). Section 1 of the Act abolished constructive malice except where the intention implicit in the other crime was an intention to kill or to do grievous bodily harm. Thus, the automatic linkage between the other crime and the murder was broken, and juries were then required to consider more directly whether the accused was culpable when engaging in the conduct resulting in death. But this made the Act unclear in its effect. Although the marginal note to the section purports to abolish the doctrine of "constructive malice", it did not abolish the concept of felony, the rules relating to the arrest of felons or the general rules specifying the test for the mental element which the juries were to apply. Hence, the Act did not abolish the principles of expressed malice or implied malice, i.e. malice could be implied by the words and expressions used by the accused, or there was a set of circumstances from which malice could be implied. These were objective tests that enabled the court to impute or "construct" the malice. This continuing common law was the basis of the decision in DPP v Smith where the Lords confirmed that neither expressed nor implied malice had been repealed by the section. It was not until the Criminal Law Act 1967 abolished the distinction between felonies and misdemeanours that the old common law rules on malice for the proof of mens rea in felonies could no longer apply.

Voluntary manslaughter defences
The Act created two partial defences—diminished responsibility and suicide pact—to murder which, if satisfied, reduce a charge of murder to a charge of manslaughter. It also changed the law of another partial defence to murder provocation.

Diminished responsibility
In 1953 the Report of the Royal Commission on Capital Punishment took the view that mental abnormality which resulted in a diminished responsibility, was relatively common and potentially of importance to a wide range of offences. The Commission therefore asserted that a "radical" amendment to the existing law would not be justified for the "limited" purpose of enabling the courts to avoid imposing the death sentence. Parliament was not impressed and section 2 of the Act now provides that diminished responsibility is available as a defence where the accused was, at the time of the offence, suffering from an "abnormality of the mind" which substantially impaired his mental responsibility for his acts or omissions resulting in murder. The burden of proof is on the accused to show that she/he was suffering from diminished responsibility.

This defence is distinguishable from the defence of insanity for while the former requires a substantial impairment of mental responsibility arising from an abnormality of the mind, the latter requires a defect of reason arising from a disease of the mind. Broadly, the difference is that diminished responsibility is characterised by a temporary emotional or mental state which causes the accused to lose control over whether and how to act, whereas insanity is any inherent (internal) defect which so radically affects the defendant that he or she does not understand what is being done or that it is legally wrong to do it (other conditions may cause the accused to become an automaton, i.e. to be unable to control her/his body's movements, see automatism and its case law). A further distinction is that the defence of diminished responsibility reduces a murder charge to voluntary manslaughter, whereas the defence of insanity excuses the accused of all guilt (but may require the accused to be placed in special care, say, by imposing a hospital order under section 37 of the Mental Health Act 1983, and automatism  results in a complete acquittal.

Abnormality of the mind
An abnormality of the mind is a "state of mind so different from that of ordinary human beings that the reasonable man would term it abnormal". This can arise from a mental incapacity to reason properly or from an inability to exercise willpower to control physical acts.  Examples of an abnormality of the mind included:
post-natal depression (R v Reynolds [1988])
battered woman syndrome (R v Ahluwahlia [1992]; R v Hobson [1998])
excessive jealousy (R v Vinagre [1979])
Intoxication may not constitute an abnormality of the mind unless the craving for alcohol has become involuntary (R v Tandy [1989]). The Coroners and Justice Act [2009] s52(1) amended the Homicide Act 1957 to use the phrase "abnormal mental functioning" instead of "abnormal mind" to highlight the psychological focus of this defence.

Substantial impairment of mental responsibility
There must be a "substantial" impairment of mental responsibility. Whether the impairment is "substantial" is defined either according to a common-sense standard or as "more than some trivial degree of impairment but less than total impairment" (R v Lloyd [1967]).

Section 3 - Provocation

Provocation can be distinguished from diminished responsibility which recognises a reduction in culpability because the defendant does not have the capacity to choose whether to break the law or not. The defence of provocation was based on the argument that a person who was so provoked as to completely lose their self-control should not be punished in the same way as those who murder wilfully. The defence was available under common law where the accused was provoked to lose his self-control. Provocation could be caused by things done or things the accused heard or said himself. The jury then decided whether the provocation would have been sufficient to cause a reasonable man to lose his self-control. If so, the charge could be reduced from murder to voluntary manslaughter.  The accused needed adduce only prima facie evidence of provocation. It was then up to the prosecution to prove beyond reasonable doubt that the accused was not provoked.  Two conditions had to be satisfied:

Subjective condition. For the jury to find provocation, they had to be satisfied that the accused was actually provoked and lost self-control (R v Duffy [1949]). This was a subjective test based solely on the actual effect the behaviour of the victim had on the accused.
Objective condition. The jury had also to find that the reasonable person would have done as the defendant did (R v Duffy [1949]).

It was thus possible for a person to have been subjectively provoked but not objectively provoked (e.g. a particularly sensitive person) or to have been objectively provoked but not subjectively provoked (e.g. a particular insensitive person). It was also possible for the provocation to have been built up over a period of time, provided that the outburst was sudden and temporary (R v Ahluwalia [1992]).

Section 3 of the Act made "the question whether the provocation was enough to make a reasonable man do as he did" the jury's responsibility. Previously this decision could be withdrawn from the jury by the judge.

In 2004 the Law Commission recommended substantial revision to this defence in their report on Partial Defences to Murder. Section 3 was repealed on 4 October 2010 by section 56(2)(a) of the Coroners and Justice Act 2009.

Suicide pact
Parliament's intention in section 4 was to show some compassion for those who had been involved in a suicide pact but failed to die. The reason for the failure might be that the means adopted proved inadequate or the survivor's commitment was fragile. In either event, the trauma of involvement in such a pact was considered equivalent to a punishment and that the mandatory life sentence of murder was an inappropriate sentence for such defendants. Thus the Act provides that where the accused kills a person, or is party to a person being killed, while acting in accordance with a suicide pact, the charge will be reduced from murder to manslaughter. A 'suicide pact' is a common agreement between two or more persons providing for the death of all those persons (whether they should take their own lives or those of each other). It is a requirement of the defence that the accused herself/himself had a "settled intention of dying in pursuance of the pact". This is to avoid the accused entering into a supposed pact with the real intention of committing murder. The burden is on the accused to prove that she/he:
was party to a suicide pact, and
had a settled intention of dying.

Part II – Liability to the death penalty

Until the Homicide Act was passed, the mandatory penalty for all adults convicted of murder was death by hanging. After decades of campaigning, abolitionists secured a partial victory with the Act, which limited the circumstances in which murderers could be executed, requiring mandatory life imprisonment in all other cases.

Section 5 – Capital murder

This section created a new offence of capital murder. A person was guilty of this offence if he committed murder in one of five situations:
Murder in the course or furtherance of theft; s.5(1)(a)
Murder by shooting or by causing an explosion; s.5(1)(b)
Murder in the course or for the purpose of resisting, avoiding or preventing a lawful arrest, or of effecting or assisting an escape or rescue from legal custody; s.5(1)(c)
Murder of a police officer acting in the execution of his duty, or of a person assisting a police officer so acting; s.5(1)(d)
Murder of a prison officer acting in the execution of his duty, or of a person assisting a prison officer so acting, by a person who was a prisoner at the time when he did or was a party to the murder; s.5(1)(e).

Forms of indictment for this offence were provided by S.I. 1957/699.

Section 6 – Death penalty for repeated murders

This section required the death penalty for anyone convicted of two murders. There were two subsections:
Two murders committed on separate occasions, provided both murders were committed in Great Britain; s.6(1)
The murder of two or more people being charged in the same indictment; s.6(2)

Section 7 – Abolition of the death penalty for other murders

All other murders were to be punished with mandatory life imprisonment.

Capital murder convictions

There were 75 convictions for capital murder under the Act, 66 in England and Wales and nine in Scotland. Five were of people under the age of 18; six of the convictions were reduced either to non-capital murder or manslaughter on appeal, leaving 63 men and one woman who were liable to be hanged. Of these 64, 32 (including the only woman) were recommended to mercy and were reprieved from the gallows. 32 men – 29 in England and Wales and three in Scotland – were hanged.

While the death penalty was originally still available under the subsequent Murder (Abolition of Death Penalty) Act 1965, which replaced the Homicide Act 1957, the last executions in the United Kingdom were carried out on 13 August 1964, when Peter Allen and Gwynne Evans were hanged for murdering John Alan West during a theft four months earlier, a death penalty crime under the 1957 Act.

England and Wales

Scotland

Abolition of the death penalty

The death penalty for murder was suspended for five years in 1965, and permanently abolished in 1969 (although it still remained for treason until 1998). The penalty today is life imprisonment under the Murder (Abolition of Death Penalty) Act 1965.

See also

Murder in English law
Suicide
R v Betts and Ridley
Ughill Hall shootings, where the act was used unsuccessfully as a defense

References

External links

The Homicide Act 1957, as amended, from the Office of Public Sector Information.

English criminal law
United Kingdom Acts of Parliament 1957
Criminal law of the United Kingdom
Murder in the United Kingdom
Death penalty law